The Polish Mountain Hillclimb is a racing event in Flintstone, Maryland sanctioned by the Washington DC region of the Sports Car Club of America and operated under the SCCA regulations as a Level 4 Time Trial event. The event is part of the Pennsylvania Hillclimb Association. Traditionally, the first night of the three-day festivities consists of a car show with the next two days being the time trials. The inaugural event was held the weekend of August 3-5, 2007. The next event will be held August 5 & 6 2023

External links
PA Hillclimb Association Schedule/Results
 Pennsylvania Hill Climb Association - Official Page
 Polish Mountain Hill Climb 2012 results and Course Records 2007-present
 Map of the Course
Hillclimbs
Auto races in the United States
Motorsport in Maryland
Recurring sporting events established in 2007